The Le Chéile Schools Trust is a charitable trust which manages around 60 schools in Ireland on behalf of fifteen Roman Catholic religious congregations.

History
The majority of secondary schools and some junior schools in Ireland were established and managed by various Roman Catholic religious congregations. In the late 1900s, these religious orders had declined in number and it was decided to pool their resources in a number of collaborative arrangements known as trusts. The Le Chéile Schools Trust was established in 2004 and fully enacted over the following years. The trust was formally established as a company limited by guarantee in 2008.

The trust was originally set up by twelve Roman Catholic religious congregations. In 2009, the Sisters of St. Joseph of Cluny joined the trust. followed by the Ursuline College in 2013 and the Marianists (St Laurence College) in 2019.

In September 2014, in Tyrellstown, Le Cheile opened the first Catholic secondary school in 30 years in Ireland.

Mission and establishment
Its mission is to maintain and promote the Catholic ethos of these schools, and develop new schools where the need arises. There are a total of 59 voluntary and 7 community schools managed by the trust.

Congregations participating in Le Cheile
 De La Salle Brothers
 Dominican Sisters
 Faithful Companions of Jesus
 Patrician Brothers
 Poor Servants of the Mother of God
 Religious of Christian Education
 Religious of Jesus and Mary
 Sisters of Charity of St. Paul
 Sisters of St. Louis
 Sisters of the Cross and Passion
 Sisters of St. Joseph of Cluny
 Society of the Holy Child Jesus
 Sisters of the Holy Faith
 Ursuline Sisters
 Marianists of Ireland

Schools
A partial list of the schools within the Trust follows:

Cork
 St Aloysius College, Carrigtwohill
 St. Angela's College, Cork
 Ursuline College, Blackrock, Cork
 Le Chéile Secondary School, Ballincollig

Dublin
 Árdscoil La Salle, Raheny, Dublin 5
 Beneavin De La Salle College, Beneavin Rd, Dublin 11
 Da La Salle College, Churchtown, Dublin
 Holy Faith Secondary School, Clontarf, Dublin 3
 Le Cheile Secondary School, Tyrrelstown, Dublin
 Maryfield College, Dublin
 Mother of Divine Grace, Primary School, Ballygall, Glasnevin, Dublin 11 (Holy Faith Sisters)
 Mount Sackville Secondary School, Chapelizod, Dublin (Sisters of St Joseph of Cluny)
 Muckross Park College, Dublin
 Our Lady's School, Templeogue, Dublin
 Our Lady’s Grove, Goatstown, Dublin 14
 St Benildus College, Kilmacud, Dublin
 St. Dominic's College, Cabra
 St. John's College, Ballyfermot, Dublin
 St. Louis Infant School, Rathmines, Dublin 6
 St Laurence College, Loughlinstown, Co. Dublin
 St. Louis Primary School, Rathmines, Dublin 6
 St. Paul’s Senior Primary School, Dublin 12

Galway
 Dominican College, Galway
 Scoil Íde, Salthill, Galway

Kildare
 St. Wolstan's Community School, Celbridge

Limerick
  Laurel Hill Coláiste FCJ, Limerick
 Scoil Pól, Kilfinane

Sligo
 Ursuline College Sligo (Ursuline Sisters)

Tipperary
 Scoil Angela, Thurles

Waterford
 De La Salle College Waterford

Operations
The Trust's administration office is based in the Jesuit complex at Milltown Park, Dublin, and the trust produces a newsletter called Le Cheile Update.

References

External links
Official website

Education in the Republic of Ireland
Educational organisations based in the Republic of Ireland
Children's charities based in the Republic of Ireland
Child education organizations
Organizations with year of establishment missing